All Fall Down is a 1962 American drama film, adapted from the novel All Fall Down (1960) by James Leo Herlihy, the author of Midnight Cowboy (1965).  John Frankenheimer directed and John Houseman produced. The screenplay was adapted by playwright William Inge and the film starred Eva Marie Saint and Warren Beatty. Upon its release, the film was a minor box-office hit. Together with her performance in Frankenheimer's The Manchurian Candidate (1962), Angela Lansbury (who played a destructively manipulative mother in both films) won the year's National Board of Review Award for Best Supporting Actress. The film was entered in the 1962 Cannes Film Festival.

Plot
Berry-Berry Willart (Beatty) is a young, handsome hedonistic drifter who has no trouble living off the women of all ages he seduces. When the women become too attached to him, his charm turns sadistic and frequently lands him in jail for battery. Berry-Berry is always on the road far from home, rarely seen by his drunken father Ralph (Karl Malden), his adoring but controlling and manipulative mother, Annabel (Angela Lansbury), or his sixteen-year-old brother Clinton (Brandon deWilde).

The story follows Clinton, who idolizes Berry-Berry, despite having to bail him out of jail in Florida, and later accompanying Ralph to Western Union to wire bail money when Berry-Berry is arrested a second time for beating up a woman. Remarks by Ralph indicate this isn't the first time he's wired bail money for Berry-Berry.

Clinton is infatuated with Echo O'Brien (Eva Marie Saint), the 31-year-old daughter of a family friend who stays with them when she visits town. Though beautiful, Echo has never married, and is getting over the suicide of her troubled long-time boyfriend over a year before. She is friendly toward the much younger Clinton, referring to him affectionately as "my guy."

But when she meets Berry-Berry, there's an instant mutual attraction between them, and they abruptly leave a family backyard cookout that evening to be alone together.

Berry-Berry asks Clinton for permission to be with Echo, saying that he wants her and she wants him, but acknowledging that Clinton saw her first. He says he'll back off if Clinton doesn't give the okay. Clinton, knowing he has no real chance with Echo, tells Berry-Berry to treat her nice.

After this, Berry-Berry and Echo are constantly in each other's company.

When they return home after an evening out some time later, Berry-Berry finds out that Echo is pregnant. She tells him that she doesn't expect anything from him; that she took a gamble that someday he would love her, not that he'd marry her, and she lost. As she tells him he's free, he runs out of the house and drives off in the rain, leaving her in tears. Clinton, who had been eavesdropping, witnesses the whole exchange.

Echo decides she must leave the Willarts' house immediately. She assures Clinton, who's concerned about the rain and the late hour, that she loves driving at night. But the Willarts are awakened later by a call from a state trooper, reporting that Echo had driven off the road and been killed in the ensuing crash.

Ralph tells Annabel and Clinton that Echo was too good a driver for her crash to have been an accident, and that Berry-Berry must have had something to do with it. Clinton suddenly throws Berry-Berry's framed portrait to the floor and stomps on it. Annabel pushes him away, picks up the portrait and holds it closely, shrieking that she doesn't care what Berry-Berry's done, she'll love him always.

Clinton sneaks into Berry-Berry's room when his brother is out, and gets the latter's pistol (which Berry-Berry had shown him earlier) and waits behind the curtains for Berry-Berry to return. But he's surprised to see Berry-Berry, when he finally returns, collapse onto the bed, sobbing. Clinton returns the pistol where he found it and leaves, seeing Berry-Berry as someone to be pitied.

Cast

Reception

Critical
Bosley Crowther of The New York Times panned the film, describing it as "distasteful and full of cheap situations and dialogue". He found the movie's premise—that "everyone in the story is madly in love with a disgusting young man who is virtually a cretin"—fatally flawed.

Pauline Kael gave the film faint praise for being "ambitious" and "elaborately staged", but contrary to reviews of the original novel – which was met upon its release by "widespread critical acclaim" – Kael disliked the story itself. Referring to Clinton, she wrote: "Does anybody really grow up the way this boy grows up? He learns the truth, squares his shoulders, and walks out into the bright sunlight, as Alex North's music rises and swells in victory. How many movies have pulled this damned visual homily on us, this synthetic growing-into-a-man, as if it happened all at once and forever?"

Box office
According to MGM records, the film recorded a loss of $1,048,000.

Home media

Video
Warner Home Video released the film on Region 1 DVD as part of its "Archive Collection" on June 22, 2009.

Soundtrack
Its score had music composed and conducted by Alex North, whose other scores include Spartacus (1960) and Cleopatra (1963).

North's  score was released for the first time on CD in April 2003, on the Film Score Monthly (FSM) label in association with Turner Classic Movies Music, as FSM0606, a limited-release of 3,000, along with North's suite for the film The Outrage (1964), directed by Martin Ritt. FSM described North's soundtrack as a "poignant, sweetly jazzy score...full of hushed, haunting textures, with lovely themes drawing the pained connections between the characters, delicately balanced between love and pain".

See also

 List of American films of 1962
 List of drama films

References

External links
 
 
 
 
 
 

1962 drama films
1962 films
American drama films
American black-and-white films
1960s English-language films
Films scored by Alex North
Films based on American novels
Films directed by John Frankenheimer
Films set in Florida
Films set in Ohio
Films shot in Florida
Metro-Goldwyn-Mayer films
1960s American films